Dogs Die in Hot Cars was a Scottish band from St. Andrews, consisting of members Craig Macintosh (vocals, guitar), Gary Smith (vocals, guitar), Ruth Quigley (vocals, keyboards), Lee Worrall (bass and glockenspiel) and Laurence Davey (drums and percussion).

History
Macintosh, Smith, Worrall and Davey all met at Madras College and began playing together in 1993 at the age of 14. After having performed under various names, they settled on "Dogs Die in Hot Cars" in 1997. In 1999 they moved to Glasgow where they met Ruth Quigley to complete the line up. The band listed their influences among others as Nirvana, Red Hot Chili Peppers, The Beatles and Talking Heads.

Later that year, the band signed a one-off single deal with EMI subsidiary label, Radiate Records. The single included the songs "I Love You 'Cause I Have To", "Celebrity Sanctum" and "Somewhat Off The Way". In the autumn of 2003, the band signed to V2 Records and Chrysalis Publishing.

In July 2004 they released their debut album Please Describe Yourself (Produced by Langer & Winstanley), which included the tracks "I Love You 'Cause I Have To", "Godhopping" and "Lounger". "Godhopping" peaked at No. 24 on the UK Singles Chart and remains the band's biggest hit. "I Love You 'Cause I Have To" peaked at No. 32 on the UK Singles Chart.

A song of the band's, entitled "Nobody Teaches Life Anything" (found on the release in 2004 of Man Bites Man EP) was used for four years in television advertising campaign in the United Kingdom by Boots.

In 2006, following the departure of their guitarist Gary Smith, the band entered the studio to record their second album. However, during a break in the recording schedule, the remaining members decided to abandon the album.

In 2008, the band released seventeen demos that they had written for the second album, for people to remix and rewrite how they liked, with the intention being that of the best mixes for each song, they would compile a final record and share any potential royalties from it 50 to 50 with those who contributed. Following this, however, on their website it states that "the band felt there weren't enough mixes to warrant a release as just conclusion to the project and to the band".

Band members
 Craig Macintosh (lead vocals, guitar)
 Gary Smith (guitar, backing vocals)
 Lee Worrall (bass, glockenspiel)
 Ruth Quigley (keyboards, backing vocals)
 Laurence Davey (drums, percussion)

Discography

Studio albums

Extended plays

Singles

Compilations
 Nano-Mugen Compilation (with "I Love You 'Cause I Have to", 2005)
 Teachers 4 (Soundtrack to the Channel 4 Television series) (with "Celebrity Sanctum", 2005)
 Keep Pop Loud (with "Beauty US", 2011)

References

External links
 Official Dogs Die In Hot Cars website

Scottish indie rock groups
Musical groups established in 1997
Musical groups disestablished in 2006
Musical groups reestablished in 2008
People educated at Madras College